The Felmer or Șoarș is a right tributary of the river Olt in Romania. It discharges into the Olt in Hălmeag.

References

Rivers of Romania
Rivers of Brașov County